Gujarat Cricket Association is the governing body of the Cricket activities in the Gujarat state of India and the Gujarat cricket team. It is affiliated to the Board of Control for Cricket in India.

As a member of BCCI, it has the authority to  select players, umpires and officials to participate in state events and exercises total control over them in Gujarat. Without its recognition, no competitive cricket involving GCA-contracted players can be hosted within the State of Gujarat and India.

History

Ranji Trophy
Gujarat's first appearance in the Ranji Trophy finals came in the season 1950/51. Holkar won the high-scoring match by 189 runs, the match featured a double century by Holkar's Chandu Sarwate and a fighting 152 by Gujarati off-spinner Jasu Patel (who averaged 12.78 in 87 innings). Their second appearance came after 66 years in season 2016/17. Captain Parthiv Patel scored 90 and 143 and lead the team to win the Ranji Trophy finals by 5 wickets.

Vijay Hazare Trophy
Gujarat defeated Delhi by 139 runs in season 2015/16 to win their first title.

Home Grounds 

 Narendra Modi Stadium, Ahmedabad
 Sardar Vallabhbhai Patel Stadium, Ahmedabad
 CB Patel International Cricket Stadium, Surat
 Bilakhiya Stadium, Vapi
 Lalabhai Contractor Stadium, Surat
 Sardar Vallabhbhai Patel Stadium, Valsad

References 

Cricket administration in India
Cricket in Gujarat
1934 establishments in India
Sports organizations established in 1934